Johnny Descolines (born May 8, 1974 in Haiti) is a Haitian former professional footballer who last played for Violette AC.

Club career
Descolines played for Violette and Roulado in the Haitian League before moving abroad to play for Salvadoran league side A.D. Isidro Metapán. He rejoined Violette in summer 2007.

International career
He made his national team debut in a May 1999 friendly match against Honduras and was a Haiti squad member at the 2000 and 2002 Gold Cup Finals. He played in 3 World Cup qualification matches in 2004 in which he also scored 3 goals.

International goals
Scores and results list Haiti's goal tally first.

References

External links 
 

1974 births
Living people
Association football forwards
Haitian footballers
Haitian expatriate footballers
Expatriate footballers in El Salvador
Haitian expatriate sportspeople in El Salvador
A.D. Isidro Metapán footballers
Ligue Haïtienne players
Haiti international footballers
2000 CONCACAF Gold Cup players
2002 CONCACAF Gold Cup players